Hamid Hassani or Hamid Hasani (born 23 November 1968 in Saqqez) is an Iranian scholar and researcher, concentrated on Persian lexicography, dictionary-making, and Persian corpus linguistics, also an expert on Persian, Standard Arabic, and Kurdish prosody (metrics/ versification).

Publications, international lectures, and awards 
A.  Books in Persian:
 2009: Published Persian Beginner's Dictionary, (in Persian: Farhang-e Zabān-āmūz-e Fārsī, Sat.h-e Moqaddamātī), with Behruz Safarzadeh, Tehran, Iran Language Institute (ILI), xvi + 1210 + iv pp;
 2005: Published Persian Today Corpus: The Most Frequent Words of Today Persian, based on a one-million-word corpus (in Persian: Vāže-hā-ye Porkārbord-e Fārsi-ye Emrūz), Tehran, Iran Language Institute (ILI), 322 pp;
 2004: Published Arabic Poetry: Prosody and Rhyme (in Persian: `Arūz-o Qāfiyeh-ye `Arabī), Tehran, `Elmī va Farhangī, v + 144 pp;
 2004: Published Madārej-ol-Balāgheh in Rhetoric (in Persian: Madārej-ol-Balāgheh dar `Elm-e Badī`), by Rezā-Qolī Khān Hedāyat, edited and annotated by Hamid Hassani (co-editor: Behruz Safarzadeh), Tehran, The Academy of Persian Language and Literature, xix + 164 pp;
 2001: Published A Glossary of Constitution of Islamic Republic of Iran (in Persian: Farhang-e Mowzū`i-e Qānūn-e Asāsi-e Jomhūri-e Eslāmi-e Irān), Tehran, Rowzaneh 162 pp;
 1998: Published Mer'āt-ol-Khiyāl Who's Who (in Persian: Tazkereh-ye Mer'āt-ol-Khiyāl), by Shīr-`Alī Khān Lūdī, edited and annotated by Hamid Hassani (co-editor: Behruz Safarzadeh), Tehran, Rowzaneh, xxi + 370 pp;
 1992: Published Poetry of Nima (a research on poetic meters and forms of Nima Yooshij) (in Persian: Musīqi-e She`r-e Nīmā (tahqīq-ī dar owzān va qāleb-hā-ye she`ri-e Nīmā-Yūshīj), Tehran: Ketāb-e Zamān 272 pp.

B.  Papers in Persian:
 1991–present: Published more than 95 papers in Persian on Persian, Arabic, and Kurdish language and literature.

C.  International lectures in Persian and English:
 2006: "The One-Million-Word Corpus of Today Persian" (in Persian: "Peykare-ye Yek-Miliyon-Loghati-e Fārsi-e Emrūz", held at The Institute of Oriental Studies and Written Heritage of the Academy of Sciences, 5th International Congress of Persian and Tajik Scholars, Tajikistan, Dushanbe, March 2006;
 2006: "Necessity of making a today Tajik linguistic corpus" (in Tajik-Persian: "Zarūrat-i girdovari-i yak paykara-yi zabonī baroyi Tojiki-i imrūz", held at Tajik State National University (in Tajik language: Донишгоҳи миллии Тоҷикистон), Tajikistan, Dushanbe, March 2006;
 1997: "Poetry of Nima-Yooshij, Free Verse or Blank Verse?" (in English), held at University of Oslo (Blindern), Oslo, Norway, September 1997;
 1997: "Persian Prosody and Necessity of Professional Studies" (in Persian: "'Arūz-e Fārsi va zarūrat-e tahqīq-e takhassosī dar ān" (in Persian), held at Kloden Institute, Oslo, Norway, September 1997.

D. Awards (some):
 2010: Rewarded at "The 28th Iranian Best Yearbook Festival", October 2010, at the "Language Field", Tehran; for the book Persian Beginner's Dictionary, (in Persian: Farhang-e Zabān-āmūz-e Fārsī, Sat.h-e Moqaddamātī), with Behruz Safarzadeh, Tehran, Iran Language Institute (ILI), xvi + 1210 + iv pp;
 2009: Rewarded at "The 6th Festival of the Best Book Review (of the Year 2008) at the field "Linguistics", Tehran, November 2009; for reviewing the book "A Dictionary of Proper Nouns [/ General Culture]" (by Gholām-Hossein Sadri-Afshār, in collaboration with Nasrin & Nastaran Hakami, Tehran, 2005)"; the paper has been published in Lexicography Journal, Vol. I, No. 1, December 2007, pp. 270–279 (Tehran)

Projects to be done 
 The Persian Word Bank: A One-Hundred-Million-Word Corpus, with part-of-speech tagging (POS tagging), and A Frequency Dictionary of Persian, under preparation;
 The Dari (East Persian) Corpus: A One-Million-Word Corpus, with part-of-speech tagging (POS tagging), to be prepared;
 The Tajik Language Corpus: A One-Million-Word Corpus, with part-of-speech tagging (POS tagging), to be prepared;
 The Sorani Kurdish Corpus: A One-Million-Word Corpus, with part-of-speech tagging (POS tagging), to be prepared.

References

Further reading
 Jām-e-Jam Online: Persian Today Corpus 
 Ādine Book: Madārej-ol-Balāgheh in Rhetoric 
 Ādine Book: Arabic Poetry: Prosody and Rhyme 
 Ādine Book: Two books by Hamid Hassani 
 Ensāni: Some papers by Hamid Hassani 
 Rāsexoon website: Arabic Poetry: Prosody and Rhyme  
 Rāsexoon website: A Glossary of Constitution of Islamic Republic of Iran by Hamid Hassani  
 Rāsexoon website: Poetry of Nimā-Yooshij (a book by Hamid Hassani)  
 Noormags: Some papers by Hamid Hassani (1) 
 Noormags: Some papers by Hamid Hassani (2) 
 Noormags: On French Poetry (a critical paper by Hamid Hassani) 
 Behnam Design website: Persian Beginner's Dictionary, with Behruz Safarzadeh

External links 
 Hamid Hassani's profile at The Linguist List (International Linguistics Community Online) 
 Hamid Hassani's profile at LinkedIn
 Hamid Hassani's profile at Academia
 Hamshahri Online, "28th Yearbook Award Festival, 2010" 
 Website of The Academy of Persian Language and Literature: "28th Yearbook Award Festival, 2010" 
 Borna News: "28th Yearbook Award Festival, 2010" 
 Jām-e-Jam Online: "6th Festival of Book Critique, 2009" 
 Fārs News: "6th Festival of Book Critique, 2009"  
 News Iran: "6th Festival of Book Critique, 2009" 
 Hayāt: "6th Festival of Book Critique, 2009"  
 The Organization of Persian Language and Literature Development: "6th Festival of Book Critique, 2009" 
 Āftāb: "6th Festival of Book Critique, 2009" 
 Persian Beginner's Dictionary, with Behruz Safarzadeh 

1968 births
Living people
Iranian Kurdish people
People from Saghez
Linguists from Iran
Members of the Academy of Persian Language and Literature
People from Kurdistan Province
University of Tehran alumni
Kurdish scholars
Iranian grammarians
Iranian lexicographers
Linguists of Persian
Linguists of Kurdish